Angerberg is a municipality in the Kufstein district of Austria. The village was mentioned for the first time in documents in 1190.

Population

References

External links
 Official website

Cities and towns in Kufstein District